William C. Hinkley High School or simply Hinkley High School is a public high school in Aurora, Colorado, United States. It is one of eight high schools in Aurora Public Schools. In 2007, Hinkley was ranked within the top 1000 public high schools in the United States by Newsweek.

Hinkley's student newspaper is The Talon.

Hinkley is an Engineering and Biomedical pathway school.

IB Programme
Hinkley offers one of the district's few International Baccalaureate programmes, and is one of only a handful of schools to offer an IB Human Rights course.

In order to ease the 150-hour community service requirement of the IB Programme, a student organization known as the Landmines Task Force was created. The group raises money and awareness regarding the international landmine problem, donating through the United Nations Association's Adopt-A-Minefield to help eradicate landmines in Mozambique. To date, the group has raised over $20,000. The program was started by IB HL African History teacher Christine Sundberg in the 2003/2004 school year; the program has ceased to exist since the 2008/2009 school year.

Demographics
58.5% Latino
14.3% White
19.5% African American
7.3% Asian
0.4% Native American

Hinkley's free/reduced lunch rate is 62% of the students.

Athletics
Football
 1997 State 4A champions

Basketball
 1994 State 5A champions

Baseball
 1979 State 4A champions

Notable alumni
 Chris Broderick, former lead guitarist for Megadeth, 2008 – 2014
 Will Donato - jazz musician
 Brian Fisher, former MLB player (New York Yankees, Pittsburgh Pirates, Houston Astros, Seattle Mariners)
 Joel Steed, former NFL Nose Tackle, Pittsburgh Steelers

References

External links
 

Aurora Public Schools (Colorado)
Public high schools in Colorado
International Baccalaureate schools in Colorado
Educational institutions established in 1973
Schools in Arapahoe County, Colorado